9: The Last Resort is a 1996 adventure computer game developed by Tribeca Interactive. The game was produced by Robert De Niro and Jane Rosenthal, and sported a cast of voice-artists including Cher, James Belushi, Christopher Reeve, Tress MacNeille and Steven Tyler & Joe Perry of Aerosmith.  It also includes the visual style and artwork of Mark Ryden. It was developed for the Windows and the Mac OS platforms.

Plot
The player character has just inherited a hotel, The Last Resort, belonging to their deceased uncle, Thurston Last. The hotel is inhabited by nine muses. As the player character enters the hotel, it becomes clear that it is no longer a hospitable place. Its wacky inhabitants live in fear of a pair of squatters known as the Toxic Twins. Only the aeroplane-man Salty is brave enough to wander around and talk to the player character. The player's goal is to reconstruct "The Muse Machine" and banish the Toxic Twins.

Gameplay
Most of the puzzles in 9 relate to the musical theme, provided mainly by Aerosmith. Many of the puzzles are based in a specific musical instrument, such as the drums, guitar, and organ; however, no musical knowledge of these instruments is required. The gameplay centers on an organ upon which the player can play musical codes. On each "floor" of the resort, the player finds a code sheet containing instructions for playing a short musical piece on the organ. However, each sheet extends the code making it more difficult to interpret. This culminates in the final puzzle in which the player must be thoroughly familiar with the code.

Reception
GameSpot gave the game a 7.3 out of 10. It received a "B" from PC Games.

References

External links

EPK (Electronic Press Kit) for the game with in-game footage, interviews and more.

1996 video games
Adventure games
Classic Mac OS games
Video games based on musicians
Video games developed in the United States
Video games set in hotels
Windows games
GT Interactive games